Predixion Software is a software company focusing on edge analytics for connected assets. It was founded in late 2009 and is headquartered in Aliso Viejo, CA.

In September 2016, the company was acquired by Greenwave Systems.

History
2009  Predixion Software was established in late 2009 with four founding partners: Stuart Frost (founder of DATAllegro, acquired by Microsoft in 2008), Simon Arkell, Stephen DeSantis, and Jamie MacLennan

2010  The first product release was announced in September 2010; company closed its Series A Funding Round in October 2010 for $5 million led by DFJ Frontier.

2011  Predixion accepted into the EMC Select Program; EMC led company’s Series B Funding Round in September 2011 for $6 million.

Early 2012, company released predictive analytics software for the healthcare industry.

In August 2013, Predixion closed its largest funding round at $20 million for Series C led by Accenture and GE.

2014  In January, company released “Predixion in the Classroom” program allowing students and teachers free access to some Predixion Insight services. In October, Predixion joined with Salesforce.com,  In December, the company relocated corporate headquarters to Aliso Viejo, California.

Awards
 Trend-Setting Products in Data and Information Management for 2015 by Database Trends and Applications (December, 2014) 
 Microsoft Health Users Group Innovation Award
 Big Data 50 – selected as one of the hottest Big Data startups of 2014.	
 CIO Review's 100 Most Promising Technology Companies (2014).
 Outstanding Technology CEO (Simon Arkell) from OC Tech Alliance (2014).

References 

Defunct software companies of the United States
Data management software